Angela's Eyes is an American crime drama series that aired from July 16 until October 15, 2006 on Lifetime, running for 13 episodes. The show aired Sundays at 10 p.m. Lifetime announced that the show would not be picked up for a second season.

Premise
Angela's Eyes followed Angela Henson Anderson, an FBI agent who had a gift for knowing when people were lying by reading their body language. Her imprisoned parents Colin and Lydia Anderson were the two most notorious spies in the U.S. After an adolescence haunted by their mistakes, Angela decided to put her gift of seeing liars to good use and spend her time putting away the "bad guys".

Main cast

Episodes
Every title of the episodes contains the word "eye" excluding "Pilot".

References

External links
 
 The final episode summarized

2000s American drama television series
2006 American television series debuts
2006 American television series endings
Espionage television series
Lifetime (TV network) original programming
Television series by Universal Television
Television shows filmed in Toronto